Ma Liang (Chinese: 马亮) (born 1984), who writes under the pen name Anthony (Chinese: 安东尼), is a Chinese young adult fiction writer. Anthony was born in Dalian, China, then went to Melbourne, Australia, to study, majoring in hotel management.

Major works 
He is best known for his first book, A Journey, through Time, with Anthony, published in 2008. The book was made into a movie, Les Aventures d'Anthony, released in November 2015.

In 2010, Anthony published his second book, Picturing My Love, Honey, a collaboration with the illustrator Echo. It has sold more than 800,000 copies.

Education 
Ma graduated from Liaoning University and attended the University of Melbourne, majoring in hotel management.

References 

Chinese fiction writers
Writers of young adult literature
Living people
21st-century pseudonymous writers
1984 births